The 1896 United States presidential election in Idaho took place on November 3, 1896. All contemporary 45 states were part of the 1896 United States presidential election. State voters chose three electors to the Electoral College, which selected the president and vice president.

Background
Idaho, upon its organization as a territory was overwhelmingly Democratic, but had been increasingly dominated by the Republican Party in the years leading up to statehood, as ex-Southern and Mormon mining settlers were increasingly outweighed by those from the Midwest. The state Democratic Party would regroup and its pro-silver, anti-Mormon faction under Marshal Fred T. Dubois would bring the state into the Union in the late 1880s.

Upon statehood, Idaho was shaken by a wave of strikes in the silver-mining regions and even deeper conflict whereby an idled ore concentrator was destroyed in Gem. This, alongside opposition to Republican Governor Norman Bushnell Willey’s declaration of martial law upon the miners, and against the absentee ownership of Idaho's land and water, would turn the state's electorate strongly towards the Populist leader James B. Weaver, who carried the state in 1892 in an election where Gold Democrat and former President Grover Cleveland was not even on the ballot.

As the 1896 election approached, it was clear that silver politics would be the determining factor in Idaho's vote, and that the state would not vote for any candidate opposing free silver. Senator Fred T. Dubois, who had been a critical player in giving Idaho statehood, confirmed this in June. When William Jennings Bryan gained the Democratic nomination on a platform favouring the coinage of silver at 16:1 relative to gold, the Populist Party supported him throughout the country.

Vote
Idaho was won by the Democratic/Populist nominees, William Jennings Bryan of Nebraska and his running mate Arthur Sewall of Maine. Bryan won every county, and only in three of twenty-one did McKinley crack a quarter of the vote. Despite half a century of overwhelming Republican dominance, no presidential nominee of either party has ever equaled Bryan's performance in the state. 

Bryan would later defeat McKinley again in Idaho four year later but would later lose the state to William Howard Taft in 1908.

Results

Results by county

See also
 United States presidential elections in Idaho

Notes

References

Idaho
1896
1896 Idaho elections